Klem is a surname. Notable people with the name include:

 Bill Klem (1874–1951), American baseball umpire
 Christian Klem (born 1991), Austrian footballer
 Daniel Klem, American ornithologist
 Erik Klem (1886–1965), Danish gymnast
 Gustav Gierløff Klem (1898–1959), Norwegian forester
 Harald Klem (1884–1954), Danish gymnast and swimmer
 Meindert Klem (born 1987), Dutch rower
 Theodor Klem (1889–1963), Norwegian rower

See also
 KLEM, radio station
 Klem (film), 2023 Dutch film
Klemm (surname)
Klemme (disambiguation)
Clem (disambiguation)
Klein (surname)

Surnames of Brazilian origin